The Osoriinae are a subfamily of beetles in the family Staphylinidae, the rove beetles. They are found mainly in tropical and subtropical regions.

Description
The abdomen is flattened and has parallel sides. A suture along each side or the abdomen may be made up of fused plates.

Biology
Little is known about the biology of this subfamily. Species may be found in leaf litter, under bark, or in ant nests. They are detritivores and fungivores.

Systematics

 Тribe Eleusinini Sharp, 1887
 Eleusis  Laporte, 1835
 Renardia  Motschulsky, 1865
 Triga
 Zeoleusis  Steel, 1950
Tribe Leptochirini Sharp, 1887
 Borolinus  Bernhauer, 1903
 Bothrys  Fauvel, 1895
 Leptochirus  Germar, 1824
 Priochirus Sharp, 1887
 Thoracochirus Bernhauer, 1903
Tribe Osoriini Erichson, 1839
 Afrosorius Fagel, 1958
 Afrotyphlopsis Fagel, 1955
 Allogonus Coiffait, 1978
 Allosorius Fagel, 1959
 Anancosorius Bernhauer, 1908
 Andringitrana Coiffait, 1979
 Antillosorius Irmler, 2010
 Arpagonus Blackwelder, 1952
 Atopocnemius Bernhauer, 1914
 Bacillopsis  Normand, 1920
 Baculopsis s Cameron, 1928
 Bothrys Fauvel, 1895
 Craspedus Bernhauer, 1908
 Cylindrops Fagel, 1955
 Cylindropsis  Fauvel, 1885
 Edapholotrochus Fagel, 1958
 Euparagonus Fagel, 1955
 Fagelia Coiffait, 1979
 Leptotyphlopsis  Scheerpeltz, 1931
 Lusitanopsis  Coiffait, 1961
 Neocaledonopsis  Pace, 1990
 Nototorchus McColl, 1985
 Oligotyphlopsis Scheerpeltz, 1951
 Osorius Guérin-Méneville, 1829
 Paratorchus McColl, 1985
 Typhloiulopsis Scheerpeltz, 1931
 Typhlosorius Coiffait, 1958
Tribe Thoracophorini Reitter, 1909
 Aneucamptus Sharp, 1887
 Dirocephalus Silvestri, 1938
 Espeson Schaufuss, 1882
 Euctenopsia Bruch, 1942
 Fauva Blackwelder, 1952
 Geomitopsis Scheerpeltz, 1931
 Glyptoma Erichson, 1839
 Liberiana Blackwelder, 1942
 Lispinodes Blackwelder, 1942
 Lispinus Erichson, 1839
 Mesotrochus Wasmann, 1890
 Nacaeus Blackwelder, 1942
 Neolosus Blackwelder, 1942
 Pardirocephalus Bruch, 1942
 Parespeson Bernhauer, 1926
 Pselaphomimus Bruch, 1942
 Rhopalopherus Bernhauer, 1909
 Synaenictus Patrizi, 1947
 Tannea Blackwelder, 1952
 Teiros Eichelbaum, 1909
 Tetrapleurus Bernhauer, 1914
 Thoracophorus Motschulsky, 1837
 incertae sedis:
 Aschnaosorius

References

External links
 
 
 Osoriinae. Bugguide.net

Further reading
Newton, A. F., et al. 2001. 22. Staphylinidae Latreille, 1802. p. 272–418. In: Arnett, R. H. and M. C. Thomas (eds.). American Beetles, Volume 1. CRC Press; Boca Raton, Florida. ix + 443 p.

 
Beetle subfamilies